Seremet is a surname, a variant of Šeremet. Notable people with the surname include:

Dino Seremet (born 1980), Slovenian footballer
Mark E. Seremet, American businessman

See also
 Szeremeta
 Sheremet (disambiguation)